Yongeichthys is a genus of gobies native to the coastal waters of the Atlantic coast of Africa, Indian Ocean and the western Pacific Ocean. The name of this genus honours the zoologist Charles Maurice Yonge (1899-1986), who led the Great Barrier Reef Expedition of 1928–1929.

Species
There are currently three recognized species in this genus:
 Yongeichthys criniger (Valenciennes, 1837)
 Yongeichthys thomasi (Boulenger, 1916)
 Yongeichthys tuticorinensis (Fowler, 1925)

References

Gobiidae